Robert Frank (13 February 1902 – 22 June 1975) was a Swiss sculptor. His work was part of the sculpture event in the art competition at the 1936 Summer Olympics.

References

1902 births
1975 deaths
20th-century Swiss sculptors
Swiss sculptors
Olympic competitors in art competitions
Artists from Basel-Stadt
20th-century Swiss male artists